The Sea Cadet Corps is a national youth charity, working with 15,000 young people between 10 and 18 years old across the UK. It has over 400 units across England, Scotland, Wales, Northern Ireland, Malta and Bermuda all run by 9,000 volunteers. Cadets follow a similar ethos, training plan, and rank structure, to the Royal Navy, and are recognised by the UK Ministry of Defence.

History 
In 1854 a Vicar in Whitstable, Kent, returning from the Crimean War noticed many local orphans on the street, he set up an orphanage encouraging sailors to form a group to help them. This led to multiple other orphanages being set up across the country. Back then the organisation was known as the Naval Lads' Brigade with sailors teaching orphans nautical skills to help them find careers in the future.

Gaining recognition, in 1899 Queen Victoria presented £10 (around £1,000 today) to the Windsor Unit to purchase uniforms.

The Navy League in 1910 sponsored a small number of units as the Navy League Boys' Naval Brigade.

In 1919 the name Navy League Sea Cadet Corps was adopted.

Lord Nuffield in 1937 donated £50,000 to fund an expansion of the Corps.

By the outbreak of World War II, there were 100 Units across the UK with more than 10,000 Cadets.

King George VI became the Admiral of the Corps in 1942 and the name was changed to the Sea Cadet Corps. The Girls Naval Training Corps was formed as well (later renamed Girls Nautical Training Corps in 1950). The Sea Cadets had approximately 400 Units and 50,000 Cadets.

In 1952 Queen Elizabeth II became the Patron of the Sea Cadets.

In 1955 the Sea Cadet Council agreed to the formation of the Marine Cadet Section.

The Girls Nautical Training Corps became affiliated with the Sea Cadet Corps in 1963.

On the 31st of March 1980, the Ministry of Defence approved the admission of girls into the Sea Cadet Corps. The integration of girls into the Sea Cadet Corps was successful and because of this, in 1992, the Girls Nautical Training Corps ceased to exist.

Ethos 

The Sea Cadets' ethos is made up of three parts: its values, its mindset, and the customs and traditions of the Royal Navy. The promise made by every cadet who joins the Sea Cadet Corps is as follows:

The Sea Cadet Promise:
I promise to serve my God, the King, my country, and, the Sea Cadet Corps and to obey the orders of my superior officers. I will be proud of my uniform and be smart and seamanlike in wearing it, and, always do my duty. 
Note: My God refers to an individual’s own faith and is intended to apply equally to those from all faiths or none. (Sea Cadets' Ethos, 2019, p4)

The ethos is underpinned by the Sea Cadet Values which are: Courage, Commitment, Discipline, Respect, Loyalty Honesty, and Integrity. These are taught by staff throughout the time cadets are with a unit, there is also an expectation that Chaplains will take a lead in such delivery (Sea Cadet Chaplaincy (2019) 3.1. Corps Values Training).

Cadets 

Sea Cadets is open to any young person between the ages of 10 and 18.

Junior Sea Cadets 
For 10 to 12-year-olds, Junior Cadets have their own training programme and uniform, based on a more practical version of the Sea Cadets training programme. When Junior Sea Cadets turn 11 years and 10 months, they can move up to being a New Entry to learn the New Entry courses, before moving up to become a Sea Cadet. In 2019, the Sea Cadets launched a pilot programme to try lowering the Junior Cadet intake age to 9 years old.

Sea Cadets 
For 12 to 18-year-olds, young people can join as a Sea Cadet and work their way up through the training programme. 
When cadets turn 18, they can either leave the Corps or they can stay and train as staff.

Royal Marines Cadets 

For 13 to 18-year-olds, the Sea Cadets has detachments of Royal Marines Cadets. They follow a more infantry-based syllabus including fieldcraft; section battle drills, fire, and manoeuvre, and general patrolling including reconnaissance missions, ambush, and fighting patrols. Other Royal Marines Cadets exist in the Volunteer Cadet Corps and Combined Cadet Force.

Admiral of the Sea Cadet Corps

Structure and organisation

National level 

The Headquarters of Sea Cadets are in Lambeth, South London. Its departments deal with:
Fundraising
Safeguarding
Finance
Training
Communications
Events

Area level 

The country is divided into six areas, which are: 
 Eastern (including Malta)
 Northern (including Northern Ireland and Bermuda)
 Southern (including the Channel Islands & Falkland Islands)
 North West (including the Isle of Man)
 London 
 South West

Each area is run by an Area Officer (AO) with a small team of support staff.

District level 
Each area is subdivided into districts of between five and twelve units which are led by volunteers.

Unit level 
Each unit is led by a Commanding Officer. Some units also have a Royal Marines Cadets Detachment, headed by a detachment commander.

Volunteers fulfill roles such as water sports instructors, fundraisers, administrative staff, etc. Sea Cadets has both uniformed adult volunteers and non-uniformed adult volunteers.

Each unit is a separate registered charity, affiliated to the Marine Society & Sea Cadets. The trustees are elected annually, except the Commanding Officer, who is appointed ex-officio. They form the Unit Management Team, responsible for providing the resources to safely carry out the training programme.

Training regime

Cadet Training Programme 
The Sea Cadet Corps follows the Cadet Training Programme (CTP) which covers various water-based activities and skills as well as first aid and leadership with lots more. Royal Marine Cadets also complete the CTP but have additional elements such as camp craft and weapon handling, amongst others.

When you become the rating of Able Cadet (AC) you start a new syllabus called the LDP (Leadership and Development Programme). This is to perfect your leadership skills and teaching skills, this will also help if cadets are looking to become members of staff.

The Cadet Training Program is broken down by ratings. For example, a Cadet 1st Class (CFC) will complete the CFC to Ordinary Cadet (OC) training.

Specialisation and proficiency training 
Skills learned in a cadet's time in the SCC usually fall into one of two categories - Specialisations and Proficiencies. Specialisations are often larger subjects than proficiencies, and so are split into three levels; Basic, Intermediate, and Advanced, each level increasing in difficulty by building on the knowledge gained from the prior levels. Basic specialisations are often gained at the unit during regular training, while Intermediate and Advanced awards are held on an Area or National basis. Proficiencies do not usually have a levelling system, though some subjects such as Piping do contain a Basic/Intermediate level.

Some specialisations, such as Marine Engineering, are also divided into disciplines such as Electrical and Mechanical engineering.

All of the following are on offer to cadets, either at the unit or on district/area/national courses.

Cadets may also work towards recognised qualifications including, Duke of Edinburgh's Award and BTEC qualifications. The BTECs are offered by CVQO, and include Teamwork and Personal Development in the Community (formerly Public Service), Music, and Engineering.

Many qualifications are run by the Sea Cadets but regulated by external bodies. In these cases, cadets earn independent qualifications that are recognised outside the Corps. These include paddle sport, where they can gain PaddlePower or Star Awards through British Canoeing (formerly known as BCU), First Aid, where they can earn St John Ambulance First Aid certifications, Rowing, where they can earn British Rowing (BR) qualifications and Powerboating/Sailing/Windsurfing/Navigation where they can gain Royal Yachting Association (RYA) qualifications. National courses are also held, often on Royal Navy bases, to teach skills such as leadership and teamwork. Specialist qualification courses include power boating in Scotland, cooking in Preston, and fire fighting in Cornwall. There are competitions at varying levels in many of the sports, proficiencies, and specializations of the SCC. Competitions start at a District level and progress through to the National level.

Ranks and rates

Cadets 
From New Entry through to Able Cadet, Sea Cadets are promoted based on their completion of various task-based modules under the CTP - Cadet Training Programme. Leading Cadets and Petty Officer Cadets are required to attend and pass a promotion board (held at an area or national level) before being promoted. If they then go on to become an instructor they must join as a civilian instructor first, unless they were a Petty Officer Cadet then they will be able to join as a Probationary Petty Officer.

The ranks of Marine Cadet 2nd Class (MC2) and Marine Cadet 1st Class (MC1) were phased out at the end of 2018.

All Royal Marines Cadets are required to complete boards for each promotion. The higher the board the higher the level the board is run at. The former promotions from Marine Cadet to Marine Cadet 2nd Class and to Marine Cadet 1st Class were run at the detachment level. Marine Cadet to Lance Corporal boards are at troop or company level, Lance Corporal to Corporal boards are at the company level, and Corporal to Sergeant boards are at a national level. All promotions boards have multiple sections all of which must be passed individually.

Junior Cadets

Adult officers 
The following rates and ranks can be awarded to uniformed adult volunteers, there are also Non-uniformed Civilian Instructors (CIs) and Unit Assistants (UAs). From 2009 to 2019, if a person joined as a Civilian Instructor and wanted to be a uniformed member of staff, they would become an Acting Petty Officer or Sergeant, following a 6-month probationary period. From 2020, an adult can join as a uniformed member of staff as a probationary Petty Officer or Sergeant on completion of their application process.

Officers are commissioned under the Cadet Forces Commission.

Another rank is Chaplain, they also commission under the Cadet Forces Commission.

Ships 
The Sea Cadets have three classes of offshore vessels, all of which are capable of coastal/offshore passage making. Sea Cadet voyages normally last for 6 days, with cadets gaining RYA qualifications for their voyage. Individual Sea Cadet units also have various boats including MOD motor boats such as Vikings, Champs, Dories. Units may also have 1 or more ribs equipped with outboard engines, and possibly a rigiflex 360, in addition to vessels designed specifically for the SCC such as the Trinity 500 rowing boat and RS Quest dinghy. Also on loan from the MOD, canoes, kayaks, and windsurfing equipment. Larger Boat Stations and Training Centres have larger ribs and other vessels

Current offshore fleet

TS Royalist 
TS Royalist, the Sea Cadet flagship, is a tall ship owned by the MSSC. She is used to providing week-long training courses for Sea Cadets and Royal Marines Cadets. The ship was launched in 2014 to replace the previous TS Royalist, which was over 40 years old when decommissioned. In 2013 there had been an appeal to replace the ageing flagship: £250,000 was needed this target was achieved in April 2013.

The ship's hull is of high tensile steel, with her superstructure of glass reinforced plastic. She has a crew of eight, plus up to twenty-four Cadets and two adult trainees. Twelve passengers can also be carried.

TS City of London and TS Sir Stelios 
TS City of London and TS Sir Stelios is the Sea Cadets' new (2017 and 2018 respectively) Rustler 42 yachts which have replaced the Tradewinds 35s TS Vigilant and TS City Liveryman. They are both Rustler 42 yachts and provide nationally-recognised RYA training for those wishing to gain qualifications and experience in yacht sailing. The pair travel the UK together each accommodating a crew of two, plus up to six cadets each.

TS John Jerwood and TS Jack Petchey 
These two vessels are the cadets' offshore powered training-ship. TS Jack Petchey is so named because the Jack Petchey Foundation donated £1m in order for it to be built. The Jerwood Foundation donated £1,216,700 for the construction of TS John Jerwood. The training ships can hold between 12-16 cadets, four permanent staff, and two CFAVs and provides an experience at sea focussing on deck work, navigation, bridge watchkeeping, cook/steward, and marine engineering. Each vessel is fitted with twin Perkins Sabre Type M215C Turbo Diesel main engines, each giving  at 2,500 rpm.

Current Inshore Fleet

Trinity 500 rowing boats 
The Trinity 500 is a stable fixed-seat rowing boat, purpose-built for the Sea Cadets to deliver the full SCC Rowing Scheme. The boat has also been approved by British Rowing, to allow for the delivery of their Explore Rowing Scheme. The boat was designed by Jo Richards, Olympic medallist and designer of a wide range of craft, in response to the requirement of the Sea Cadets for modern, low maintenance, purpose-designed fixed seat rowing boat with good performance under oars and with the capacity to mount a small outboard motor. The Trinity 500 is named to mark the quincentenary of the incorporation of Trinity House, the statutory authority for aids to navigation in England, Wales, The Channel Islands, and Gibraltar. The Trinity House Maritime Charity, a separately funded arm of the Corporation of Trinity House generously funded the design and development costs of the boat.

RS dinghies 
In a partnership between RS Sailing and the Sea Cadets, a new dinghy known as the RS Quest was designed by Jo Richards, who is also responsible for formulating the design for the Trinity 500 rowing vessel. The RS Quest was designed to accommodate the need for a new sailing dinghy within the SCC that is strong and easy to maintain and is capable of comfortably accommodating an instructor and up to three cadets. The RS Quest was unveiled at the Southampton Boat Show in 2015.
Continuing the partnership between MSSC and RS Sailing, the single sail RS Zest dinghy was launched at the 2017 Southampton Boat Show. It is intended for a crew of two but can be sailed single-handed. It is aimed at benefiting units with limited access to water, as RS Zest can operate in shallower water than the RS Quest.

Investigation into sexual abuse 
In 2012 payouts made to victims of sexual abuse across all Cadet Forces totalled £1,475,844. In 2013 payouts totalled £64,782, and in 2014 payouts totalled £544,213.

In 2017, a Panorama episode entitled "Cadet Abuse Cover-Up" highlighted sexual abuse cases in the British Cadet Forces. In a 1979 case of sexual abuse of a 14-year-old cadet in Hertfordshire, the boy's parents were dissuaded from reporting the offender to police by Sea Cadet officers in full uniform, who had visited their home. The offender was neither dismissed or suspended but instead promoted to oversee 10 cadet units in London. In the years 2012 to 2017 there were 28 allegations of sexual abuse made against SCC volunteers, including historical allegations. All 28 offenders were dismissed and referred to the police.

See also 
Other elements of the Community Cadet Forces
 Royal Marines Cadets
 Army Cadet Force
 Air Training Corps

Other MoD sponsored cadet forces
 Combined Cadet Force
 Volunteer Cadet Corps

Other Sea Cadet organisations
 Australian Navy Cadets
 Bermuda Sea Cadet Corps
 Royal Canadian Sea Cadets
 Hong Kong Sea Cadet Corps
 New Zealand Sea Cadet Corps
 United States Naval Sea Cadet Corps

Related articles
 Marine Society and Sea Cadets
 Reserve Forces and Cadets Association
 Cadet Vocational Qualification Organisation (CVQO)
 Laurie Brokenshire
 Girls' Nautical Training Corps
 National Association of Training Corps for Girls

Notes

References

External links 
 



Royal Navy
Youth organisations based in the United Kingdom
Sail training associations
British Cadet organisations
1854 establishments in the United Kingdom